A hatchet is a type of small axe.

Hatchet  may also refer to:

Media

Film 
Hatchet (film series), an American slasher film franchise
Hatchet (film), a 2006 slasher film
 Hatchet II, a 2010 sequel to the first film 
 Hatchet III, a 2013 sequel and third installment of the series

Written works 
Hatchet (novel), written in 1987 by Gary Paulsen
The Hatchet (novel), written in 1930 by Mihail Sadoveanu
The GW Hatchet, university publication

Music 
 Hatchet (band), an American thrash metal band
 Psychopathic Records, often referred to as The Hatchet due to the label's logo design
 "Hatchet" (Low song), a song by Low

Other uses 
Hatchet, Alabama, a community in the United States
Hatchet ribozyme, an RNA structure
Hatchet (Transformers), a Decepticon in the Transformers fictional universe

See also
Hatchett, a surname
Hatchet man (disambiguation)
Bury the Hatchet (disambiguation)